Betu Adolphe Tshimanga (born 21 June 1980), commonly known as Betu, is a Congolese footballer who is currently a free agent.

References

External links

1980 births
Living people
Democratic Republic of the Congo footballers
Democratic Republic of the Congo international footballers
Association football midfielders
Al-Sahel SC (Kuwait) players
Expatriate soccer players in South Africa
FC Saint-Éloi Lupopo players
AC Sodigraf players
Bryne FK players
Jomo Cosmos F.C. players
AS Vita Club players
Democratic Republic of the Congo expatriate sportspeople in Kuwait
Expatriate footballers in Kuwait
Democratic Republic of the Congo expatriate sportspeople in Norway
Democratic Republic of the Congo expatriate sportspeople in South Africa
Expatriate footballers in Norway
21st-century Democratic Republic of the Congo people